The HR Nicholls Society is an Australian think tank that focuses on industrial relations. It advocates full workplace deregulation, contains some Liberal MPs as members and is seen to be of the New Right.

It was created in March 1986 after John Stone, Peter Costello, Barrie Purvis, and Ray Evans organised a seminar aimed at discussing the Hancock Report and other industrial matters. Regular contributors to the Society's publications have been Ray Evans, Adam Bisits and Des Moore, the Director of the Institute for Private Enterprise. Adam Bisits was the President of the Society until 2017, replacing Evans, who stepped down in 2010.

The Society is named after Henry Richard Nicholls (6 January 183013 August 1912), an editor of the Hobart newspaper The Mercury, who in 1911 published an editorial criticising H. B. Higgins, then a High Court judge and President of the Commonwealth Court of Conciliation and Arbitration, accusing Higgins of behaving in a politically partisan and unjudicial manner after attacking a barrister. This led to Nicholls being prosecuted for contempt of court by the Attorney-General of the Commonwealth, only to be acquitted by the full bench of the High Court.

Aims and objectives
The Society supports the deregulation of the Australian Industrial Relations System, including the abolition of the award system, the widespread use of individual employment contracts and the lowering of minimum wages. The Society only believes in limited labour market regulation, as it believes that excessive minimum wages and employment inflexibility lead to higher unemployment and lower productivity. Since its inception, the Society has advocated what it views as reform of the labour market in order to ensure what it views as Australia's international competitiveness and prosperity. On its website, the Society lists its aims and objectives:
 To promote discussion about the operation of industrial relations in Australia including the system of determining wages and other conditions of employment.
 To promote the rule of law with respect to employers and employee organisations alike.
 To promote reform of the current wage-fixing system.
 To support the necessity for labour relations to be conducted in such a way as to promote economic development in Australia.

Politics
The Society has strong ties with the Liberal Party of Australia. For example, former Federal Treasurer Peter Costello was one of the society's founding members.

In 1986, then Prime Minister and former president of the Australian Council of Trade Unions, Bob Hawke, branded the Society as a group of "political troglodytes and economic lunatics".

Former Federal Finance Minister Nick Minchin caused controversy in early 2006 in a speech at a Society function where he told the audience that "The fact is the great majority of the Australian people do not support what we are doing on industrial relations. They violently disagree."

He said that the Coalition government "knew its reform to WorkChoices were not popular but the process of change must continue", and that "there is still a long way to go... awards, the IR commission, all the rest of it..."
The Australian Labor Party has stated that "We know the HR Nicholls society supports the abolition of awards, supports the abolition of the minimum wage, supports the abolition of the independent umpire, the Industrial Relations Commission".

In 2007, the Society criticised the WorkChoices legislation for creating even more regulation. The Society, which in fact supports deregulation of the labour market to the extent that employers and employees simply form contracts with each other and then deal with any disputes via the courts, admonished the WorkChoices model particularly for its length and the amount of red tape, claiming it was "all about regulation" and comparing it to the "old Soviet system of command and control", as well as on federalist grounds saying "This attempt on his part to diminish the role of the states, to concentrate all power in Canberra, is very much to Australia's detriment". Society President Ray Evans stated that in creating WorkChoices "John Howard has assumed an omnipotence that Labor will inherit and to which no mortal should aspire. It will end in tears." Des Moore stated on behalf of the Society that "The HR Nicholls Society is very disappointed with the work choices changes."

References

External links
Official site

Political advocacy groups in Australia
Think tanks based in Australia
1986 establishments in Australia